William Joseph Justice, (born 8 May 1942) is an American prelate of the Roman Catholic Church. Justice served as an auxiliary bishop of the Archdiocese of San Francisco in California from 2008 to 2017.

Biography

Early life and clerical formation

William Justice was born in Lawrence, Massachusetts on May 8, 1942. His family moved to San Mateo, California in 1946. From 1948 to 1951, Justice attended St. Matthew Elementary School in San Mateo, then transferred in 1956 to St. Gregory Elementary School in San Mateo. In 1960, he graduated from Junípero Serra High School in San Mateo.

Justice entered St. Joseph College in Mountain View, California in 1962 and later attended at St. Patrick Seminary in Menlo Park, California, where he earned a Master of Divinity degree in 1968.

Priesthood
Justice was ordained into the priesthood for the Archdiocese of San Francisco on May 17, 1968 by Archbishop Joseph McGucken,  

After his ordination, Justices was assigned as parochial vicar to St. John the Evangelist Parish in San Francisco. In the summer of 1969, he attended a Spanish language program in Guadalajara, Mexico. In 1970, Justice was transferred to All Souls Parish in South San Francisco, California.  He attended the Intensive Spanish Language Program at Cuernavaca, Mexico in summer of 1971. Justice was reassigned in 1976 to St. Paul Parish in San Francisco.

In 1979, Justice became director of the Office of the Permanent Diaconate along with parochial vicar of Saint Timothy Church in San Francisco.  He received a Master of Applied Spirituality degree in 1980 from the University of San Francisco. In 1981, while still working at Saint Timothy, Justice was named as secretary of the Office of Pastoral Ministry.

Justice was named pastor of Saint Peter Parish in 1985, then moved in 1991 to became parochial vicar of All Souls Parish. In 1992, he was also named the secretary of pastoral ministry for the Archdiocese  In 2003, Justice was reassigned as pastor of the Mission Dolores Basilica Parish and in 2007 appointed as archdiocesan vicar for clergy.

Auxiliary Bishop of San Francisco
On April 10, 2008, Pope Benedict XVI appointed Justice as the titular bishop of Matara de Proconsolari and as an auxiliary bishop for the Archdiocese of San Francisco.  He was consecrated by Archbishop George Niederauer on May 28, 2008, at the Cathedral of Saint Mary of the Assumption in San Francisco.

While he was episcopal vicar for clergy, Justice also served as vicar general of the Archdiocese. Justice was a trustee of St. Patrick Seminary. He chaired three archdiocesan boards: the Priest Personnel Board, the Ongoing Formation Board, and the Priests' Retirement Board. Justice chaired the Priests' Council from September 2006 to June 2007 and took part in the Alliance of Mission District Catholic Schools while pastor of Mission Dolores Basilica Parish. 

On November 16, 2017, Pope Francis accepted Justice's letter of resignation as auxiliary bishop of San Francisco; he had reached the mandatory retirement age of 75.

See also
 

 Catholic Church hierarchy
 Catholic Church in the United States
 Historical list of the Catholic bishops of the United States
 List of Catholic bishops of the United States
 Lists of patriarchs, archbishops, and bishops

References

External links
 Roman Catholic Archdiocese of San Francisco Official Site
 USCCB Bishop Listing
 Catholic Hierarchy
 USCCB Announcement of Justice becoming Auxiliary Bishop
 Archdiocese of San Francisco announcement of Justice becoming Auxiliary Bishop

1942 births
Living people
21st-century Roman Catholic bishops in the United States
Saint Patrick's Seminary and University alumni
University of San Francisco alumni
Junípero Serra High School (San Mateo, California) alumni
Catholics from California